Tritonia australis is a species of dendronotid nudibranch. It is a marine gastropod mollusc in the family Tritoniidae.

Distribution
This species was described from Calbuco, Chile .

References

Tritoniidae
Gastropods described in 1898
Endemic fauna of Chile